is a Japanese manga series written and illustrated by Gosho Aoyama. It began in Shogakukan's Weekly Shōnen Sunday in June 1987. The story tells of a phantom thief named Kaito Kid. Aoyama put the manga on hiatus after the first two tankōbon volumes were published in 1988, and only occasionally draws new chapters; the third volume was published in 1994, the fourth in 2007, and the fifth in 2017. Kaito Kid and other characters from Magic Kaito make occasional appearances in Case Closed, another manga series by Aoyama that has also been adapted into an anime.

12 animated television specials based on the series have been produced by TMS Entertainment and aired between 2010 and 2012. A 24-episode anime series titled Magic Kaito 1412 was produced by A-1 Pictures and aired from October 2014 to March 2015.

Plot
Kaito Kuroba is a normal teenage student whose father died under mysterious circumstances eight years ago. Eight years later, he is made aware of his father's secret identity; a famous international criminal known as Kaito Kid, and that he was murdered by a mysterious organization because he tried to steal a gem which was also targeted by them. The goal of the organization is to find within a year the Pandora Gem, a mystical stone said to shed tears during the passing of the Volley comet (which happens once every 10,000 years): drinking these tears bestows immortality.

He vows to prevent the organization from gaining immortality, and assumes his father's thief identity as he begins his quest for the gem. His only clues as to the gem's location are that it glows red under the full moon and that it is a doublet: a gem hidden within a larger gem. Thus, it would have to be a relatively large one with a bizarre history, and always stored in a place that never receives moonlight. He thus researches and steals famous priceless gems with odd histories from incredibly well-defended areas, but returns them after the very next full moon as they are not the Pandora.

Characters

A smart, quirky and arrogant 17 year old boy who is a master illusionist. As Kaito Kid, he occasionally appears in the Detective Conan series as an antagonist, but slowly develops a Lupin-esque complex. He has some feelings for his childhood friend Aoko Nakamori who he teases constantly. His alter ego is the Kaito Kid, a gentleman thief who publicly announces his heists; after his heists, he returns the stolen items to their owners. Occasionally he is challenged by other phantom thieves across the world, the greatest being the mysterious Kaito Corbeau from the USA. However, Kid is able to defeat them all and force all of them to retirement. His Japanese voice actor is Kappei Yamaguchi and his English voice actor is Jerry Jewell.

Aoko Nakamori is a 17 years old girl and Kaito's best childhood friend and love interest. She is an obstinate, impulsive and lighthearted girl. She often bickers with Kaito at school. She has feelings for Kaito, although she is afraid of admitting to him. She gets along well with Akako, but unknown to her, Akako envies her. Both girls vie for Kaito's affections. As the daughter of Inspector Nakamori, she despises the Kaito Kid, though she is unaware of the irony. Her Japanese voice actresses are Ayumi Fujimura in the specials and Mao Ichimichi in Magic Kaito 1412, Yukiko Iwai in episode 76 of Detective Conan, Minami Takayama in episode 219 and OVA 4 of Detective Conan.
 
Saguru Hakuba is a famous high school detective based out of Japan and one of Kaito's rivals alongside Shinichi/Conan. He is very smug about his abilities and is highly sophisticated. As the son of a high police official, he had many chances to capture the Kaito Kid but he failed. He believes that Kaito is the Kaito Kid but lacks the evidence. His Japanese voice actors are Akira Ishida in the Magic Kaito specials and in Detective Conan, and Mamoru Miyano in Magic Kaito 1412.

Akako Koizumi is a witch who has red magic and has a crush on Kuroba Kaito. Before meeting Kaito, her goal was to enamour every man in the world but Kaito's immunity to her spells makes him a target for her. She learns Kaito's identity as the Kaito Kid and becomes the only friend who knows his secret. Although she hates the fact that Kaito is able to resist her charms, she is enamoured by his independence and mysteriousness. She loves Kaito and envies Aoko for being so close to him. Her schemes involve her obsession with enslaving Kaito's heart and genuine concern for him in particular heists. Her Japanese voice actresses are Miyuki Sawashiro in the Magic Kaito specials, Eri Kitamura in Magic Kaito 1412, and Megumi Hayashibara in Detective Conan.

Ginzo Nakamori, known as Mace Fuller in Funimation's Detective Conan dub, is the inspector in charge of capturing the Kaito Kid. His Japanese voice actors are Unshō Ishizuka (1997-2018) and Kōji Ishii (2019-present) and his English voice actor is Jay Jones.

Toichi Kuroba is Kaito's father. He was the original Phantom Thief Kid and took on the role to overshadow his wife's alter ego, the Phantom Lady, allowing her to leave her life of crime. He originally used the name Phantom Thief 1412 but due to Yusaku Kudo's reading, the 1412 was read as Kid, and was used since then. Toichi was killed after impeding an unknown's organization goal for the Pandora's Tear. His Japanese voice actor is Shūichi Ikeda.

Konosuke Jii was Toichi's assistant and dressed as Kaito Kid to lure out Toichi Kuroba's killer, which caused Kaito to become the new Kaito Kid. He's now Kaito's assistant and owns a billiards bar called "Blue Parrot".

She was formerly the international thief The Phantom Lady of Twenty Faces. She fell in love with Kuroba Toichi and married him, retiring from robbery. She is the mother of Kuroba Kaito, the present Kaito Kid. Currently she is in Las Vegas, though she keeps regular contact with her son and asks Aoko to take care of him. She once tried to persuade her son to give up robbery and start a new life as a magician in Las Vegas. It is strongly implied in the "Midnight Crow" Arc that she knows who is Kaito Corbeau, the mysterious rival of Kaito Kid, who had recently become active in Las Vegas. It is also implied that she sent Corbeau to test her son.

Media

Manga
Written and illustrated by Gosho Aoyama, Magic Kaito has been sporadically serialized in Shogakukan's shōnen manga magazine Weekly Shōnen Sunday since June 10, 1987. It was halted in 1988 after two tankōbon volumes, but new chapters have been occasionally released since then; a third volume was published in 1994, a fourth volume in 2007 and a fifth volume in 2017. In 2011 the first four volumes were republished in "Treasured Editions" from August 15 to December 16. Two versions of each volume were released, one containing a DVD of one of the TV specials.

Outside of Japan, Magic Kaito has been published in China; Hong Kong; Taiwan; South Korea; Thailand; Vietnam; Finland; France; Germany; Italy; and Spain.

Volume list

Anime

Anime specials
Twelve animated television specials based on Magic Kaito have been created between 2010 and 2012. All have been directed by Toshiki Hirano, produced by TMS Entertainment and aired on Nippon Television Network System during Detective Conan'''s time slot. The first three have been titled as "Detective Conan Specials" despite the fact that none have had anything to do with the Conan'' series. The first aired on April 17, 2010.

Episode list

Anime television series

A 24-episode anime series titled  was created by A-1 Pictures and aired on NNS from October 4, 2014 to March 28, 2015. The series was announced as a new simulcast beginning with episode 13 on Crunchyroll for audiences in North America.

References

External links
 
 

1987 manga
2010 anime television series debuts
2014 anime television series debuts
A-1 Pictures
Action anime and manga
Aniplex
Gosho Aoyama
Crime in anime and manga
Mystery anime and manga
Shogakukan manga
Shōnen manga
TMS Entertainment
Yomiuri Telecasting Corporation original programming